The auricle or auricula is the visible part of the ear that is outside the head.  It is also called the pinna (Latin for "wing" or "fin", plural pinnae), a term that is used more in zoology.

Structure
The diagram shows the shape and location of most of these components:

 antihelix forms a 'Y' shape where the upper parts are:
 Superior crus (to the left of the fossa triangularis in the diagram)
 Inferior crus (to the right of the fossa triangularis in the diagram)
 Antitragus is below the tragus
 Aperture is the entrance to the ear canal
 Auricular sulcus is the depression behind the ear next to the head
 Concha is the hollow next to the ear canal
 Conchal angle is the angle that the back of the concha makes with the side of the head
 Crus of the helix is just above the tragus
 Cymba conchae is the narrowest end of the concha
 External auditory meatus is the ear canal
 Fossa triangularis is the depression in the fork of the antihelix
 Helix is the folded over outside edge of the ear
 Incisura anterior auris, or intertragic incisure, or intertragal notch, is the space between the tragus and antitragus
 Lobe (lobule)
 Scapha, the depression or groove between the helix and the anthelix
 Tragus

Development
The developing auricle is first noticeable around the sixth week of gestation in the human fetus, developing from the auricular hillocks, which are derived from the first and second pharyngeal arches. These hillocks develop into the folds of the auricle and gradually shift upwards and backwards to their final position on the head. En route accessory auricles (also known as preauricular tags) may be left behind. The first three hillocks are derived from the 1st branchial arch and form the tragus, crus of the helix, and helix, respectively.  Cutaneous sensation to these areas is via the trigeminal nerve, the attendant nerve of the 1st branchial arch. The final three hillocks are derived from the second branchial arch and form the antihelix, antitragus, and lobule, respectively. These portions of the ear are supplied by the cervical plexus and a small portion by the facial nerve. This explains why vesicles are classically seen on the auricle in herpes infections of the facial nerve (Ramsay Hunt syndrome type II).

The auricle's functions are to collect sound and transform it into directional and other information. The auricle collects sound and, like a funnel, amplifies the sound and directs it to the auditory canal. The filtering effect of the human pinnae preferentially selects sounds in the frequency range of human speech.

Amplification and modulation

Amplification of sound by the pinna, tympanic membrane and middle ear causes an increase in level of about 10 to 15 dB in a frequency range of 1.5 kHz to 7 kHz. This amplification is an important factor in inner ear trauma resulting from elevated sound levels.

Non-electrical hearing apparatuses which were designed to protect hearing (particularly that of musicians and others who work in loud environments) which fit snugly in the concha have been studied by the Institute of Sound and Vibration Research (ISVR) at the University of Southampton in the U.K.

Notch of pinna
The pinna works differently for low and high frequency sounds. For low frequencies, it behaves similarly to a reflector dish, directing sounds toward the ear canal. For high frequencies, however, its value is thought to be more sophisticated. While some of the sounds that enter the ear travel directly to the canal, others reflect off the contours of the pinna first: these enter the ear canal after a very slight delay. This delay causes phase cancellation, virtually eliminating the frequency component whose wave period is twice the delay period. Neighboring frequencies also drop significantly. In the affected frequency band – the pinna notch – the pinna creates a band-stop or notch filtering effect. This filter typically affects sounds around 10 kHz, though it can affect any frequencies from 6 – 16 kHz. It also is directionally dependent, affecting sounds coming from above more than those coming from straight ahead. This aids in vertical sound localization.

Functions

In animals the function of the pinna is to collect sound, and perform spectral transformations to incoming sounds which enable the process of vertical localization to take place. It collects sound by acting as a funnel, amplifying the sound and directing it to the auditory canal. While reflecting from the pinna, sound also goes through a filtering process, as well as frequency dependent amplitude modulation which adds directional information to the sound (see sound localization, vertical sound localization, head-related transfer function, pinna notch).  In various species, the pinna can also signal mood and radiate heat.

Clinical significance
There are various visible ear abnormalities:

 traumatic injury
 infection
 wart, mole, birthmark
 scars, including keloids
 cyst
 skin tag
 sunburn, frostbite
 pressure ulcer, often from a poorly fitting hearing aid
 anotia, absent pinna
 microtia, underdeveloped pinna
 cryptotia, a pinna covered beneath the skin of the scalp 
 Stahl's deformity, pointed pinna due to an extra fold of cartilage
 cupped or constricted ear deformity, a hooded superior helix
 preauricular pit
 preauricular tag
 Darwin's tubercle, protuberance on the anterior helix
 hypertrichosis, including hypertrichosis lanuginosa acquisita, a hairy pinna
 cauliflower ear, post-traumatic cartilage deformity
 tophus, nodule on the pinna related to gout
 chondrodermatitis nodularis chronica helicis (Winkler's nodule), a nodule initiated by solar damage
 actinic keratosis and cutaneous horn, premalignant lesions caused by solar damage
 benign and malignant neoplasm, including tumors, keratoacanthoma, carcinoma

In other species
Visible auricles are a common trait in mammals, particularly placental mammals and marsupials, but are poorly developed or absent in monotremes. Marine mammals usually have either reduced auricles or no auricals due to sound travelling differently in water than in air, as well as the fact that auricles would potentially slow them down in the water. Skin impressions show large, mouse-like auricles in Spinolestes.

External auricles are absent in other tetrapod groups such as reptiles, amphibians, and birds.

Additional images

See also

 Earrings for pierced ears
 Ear stapling

References

External links
 drtbalu otolaryngology online
 

Ear
Auditory system